Timeline of anthropology, 1900–1909

Events
1902
 The American Anthropological Association is founded

1906
Anthropos journal founded

Publications

Births
1902
E.E. Evans-Pritchard
Daryll Forde
Julian Steward

1903
Cora Du Bois
Germaine Dieterlin
Karl-Gustav Izikowitz
Louis Leakey
Siegfried Nadel
1905
Irawati Karve
Clyde Kluckhohn
Ashley Montagu
Isaac Schapera

Deaths
1902
John Wesley Powell

1905
Adolf Bastian
Karl Wernicke

1906
Homer G. Barnett
Meyer Fortes
Gutorm Gjessing
Willard Z. Park

Anthropology by decade
Anthropology
Anthropology timelines
1900s decade overviews